Cham Bagh is a village in Lorestan Province, Iran.

Cham Bagh may also refer to:

Cham Bagh-e Sofla, a village in Iran
Cham Bagh-e Veysian or Veysian, a village in Iran